The Australia national roller hockey team is the national team side of Australia at international roller hockey. 

Usually is part of FIRS Roller Hockey B World Cup.

In 2018, Australia won their first Asian Cup ever.

References

External links
Official website of Roller Hockey Australia
Official Media Partner website Drew Media Australia

National Roller Hockey Team
Roller hockey
National roller hockey (quad) teams